Chiodi is an Italian surname. Notable people with the surname include:

Alessio Chiodi (born 1973), Italian motorcycle racer
Giovanni Chiodi (born 1961), Italian politician
Pietro Chiodi (1915-1970), Italian philosopher and anti-fascist partisan
Ron Chiodi (born 1974), American snowboarder
Stefano Chiodi (1956–2009), Italian footballer

See also 
 Chiodo

Italian-language surnames
it:Chiodi (disambigua)